Guzmania farciminiformis is a species of plant in the genus Guzmania. It is in the family Bromeliaceae and the subfamily Tillandsioideae.

References

farciminiformis